Hackwood is a surname. Notable people with the surname include:

Frederick Hackwood (1851–1926), teacher, antiquarian, journalist, and writer
Paul Hackwood (born 1961), English priest
Susan Hackwood, American electrical engineer
William Hackwood ( 1757–1839), English sculptor

See also
Hackwood Stakes, flat horse race in Newbury, England